Ubley is a small village and civil parish within the Chew Valley in Bath and North East Somerset about  south of Bristol. It is just south-east of Blagdon Lake, just off the A368 between Compton Martin and Blagdon.

History

There is some evidence of a burial tumulus from neolithic times above Ubley.

In a charter of King Edgar, between 959 and 975 the name of the village was recorded as Hubbanlege.

Ubley was listed in the Domesday Book of 1086 as Tumbeli, meaning 'The rolling meadow' from the Old English tumb and leah. An alternative explanation is that it comes from Ubba's leah or clearing in the woodland. A further explanation of the name is that in Roman times when Charterhouse Roman Town was producing lead and silver it was known as Veb, and as V and U are interchangeable in Latin, Ubley derives from Veb-ley, and was originally a settlement where Romano-British lead miners lived.

The parish was part of the hundred of Chewton.

Mining for ochre and manganese took place during the 19th century.

Governance

The parish council has responsibility for local issues, including setting an annual precept (local rate) to cover the council's operating costs and producing annual accounts for public scrutiny. The parish council evaluates local planning applications and works with the local police, district council officers, and neighbourhood watch groups on matters of crime, security, and traffic. The parish council's role also includes initiating projects for the maintenance and repair of parish facilities, such as the village hall or community centre, playing fields and playgrounds, as well as consulting with the district council on the maintenance, repair, and improvement of highways, drainage, footpaths, public transport, and street cleaning. Conservation matters (including trees and listed buildings) and environmental issues are also of interest to the council.

Ubley is part of the Chew Valley South Ward, which is represented by one councillor on the unitary authority of Bath and North East Somerset which was created in 1996, as established by the Local Government Act 1992. It provides a single tier of local government with responsibility for almost all local government functions within its area including local planning and building control, local roads, council housing, environmental health, markets and fairs, refuse collection, recycling, cemeteries, crematoria, leisure services, parks, and tourism. It is also responsible for education, social services, libraries, main roads, public transport, Trading Standards, waste disposal and strategic planning, although fire, police and ambulance services are provided jointly with other authorities through the Avon Fire and Rescue Service, Avon and Somerset Constabulary and the Great Western Ambulance Service.

Bath and North East Somerset's area covers part of the ceremonial county of Somerset but it is administered independently of the non-metropolitan county. Its administrative headquarters is in Bath. Between 1 April 1974 and 1 April 1996, it was the Wansdyke district and the City of Bath of the county of Avon. Before 1974 that the parish was part of the Clutton Rural District.

The parish is represented in the House of Commons of the Parliament of the United Kingdom as part of North East Somerset. It elects one Member of Parliament (MP) by the first past the post system of election.

Geography
The village lies under the northern slopes of the Mendip Hills within the Chew Valley about 8 miles south of Bristol and 10 miles from Bath. It is just south-east of Blagdon Lake and between Blagdon Lake and Chew Valley Lake.

Demography
According to the 2001 Census, the Chew Valley South Ward (which includes Nempnett Thrubwell) had 1,032 residents, living in 411 households, with an average age of 42.1 years. Of these, 74% of residents described their health as 'good', 20% of 16- to 74-year-olds had no qualifications; and the area had an unemployment rate of 1.7% of all economically active people aged 16–74. In the Index of Multiple Deprivation 2004, it was ranked at 22,950 out of 32,482 wards in England, where 1 was the most deprived LSOA and 32,482 the least deprived.

Landmarks

War memorial

The village war memorial is 2.5 metres high and has a three-stepped base. It commemorates the five people from the village who died in World War I.

Village hall

The modern village hall is the venue for Rainbow Guides on a Monday during term time as well as the monthly Ubley Publey and annual Chew Valley Beer Festival.

Grade II listed buildings

Transport

Ubley lies on the A368 between Compton Martin and Blagdon, although the village centre is north of the main road and served only by minor roads.

Education

In the village is a primary school

Religious sites

The village has a small medieval church, the Church of St Bartholomew originating from the 13th century with later additions. The church has no fixed pews. Features include a Jacobean pulpit and a chained copy of the 'Paraphrases of Erasmus' dated 1552. The church is a Grade I listed building.

References

External links

 
 Map of Ubley circa 1900

Mendip Hills
Civil parishes in Somerset
Villages in Bath and North East Somerset